The Women's 3000 metres event at the 2023 European Athletics Indoor Championships was held on 2 March at 20:30 (heats), and on 3 March at 20:18 (final) local time.

Medalists

Records

Results

Heats
Qualification: First 6 in each heat (Q) and the next 3 fastest (q) advance to the Final.

Final

References

2023 European Athletics Indoor Championships
3000 metres at the European Athletics Indoor Championships